Sergei Vladimirovich Timofeyev (born 26 June 1981 in Volgograd) is a former Russian football player.

References

1981 births
Living people
Russian footballers
FC Rotor Volgograd players
Russian Premier League players
Russian expatriate footballers
Expatriate footballers in Kazakhstan
FC Tekstilshchik Kamyshin players

Association football defenders
Sportspeople from Volgograd